The 1912–13 Columbia men's ice hockey season was the 17th season of play for the program.

Season
After a very good finish the year before, Columbia was looking forward to competing for the IHA championship. Shortly after the final cuts were announced and the lineup for the team was announce the team encountered a sizeable problem. The IHA had held a meeting regarding player eligibility (no freshman and only three years of eligibility in league games) to which Columbia could not immediately agree. The Columbia representative referred the matter to his faculty committee and the team would continue to play its IHA schedule in the interim. The operators of the St. Nicholas Rink, however, decided that since the matter had not been settled Columbia's place in the IHA was not stable enough to allow the team to practice at the rink. While Columbia choose to play games against the IHA opponents regardless of their place in the league, the Columbia athletic committee decided to uphold its own eligibility requirements (four years of eligibility) regardless of what the IHA rules were. After a resolution could not be reached, Columbia left the IHA in mid-December. Fortunately, despite resigning from the IHA, the St. Nicholas rink did become available for the team afterwards. J. S. Bates, due to being ineligible for intercollegiate games, turned over captaincy of the team to F. N. Bangs.

After the upheaval in December, Columbia began its season on a low note, losing 0–6 to Yale with many of the previous season's players not appearing. After a game against Saegkill Golf Club was postponed due to no ice, Columbia attempted to produce a schedule on the fly. Unfortunately, all members of the IHA refused to schedule any games against the Lions, leaving Columbia with few opportunities. The match against Saegkill was played in early February with the Lions narrowly falling 6–7 in double overtime. Unable to schedule any further games, Columbia's season ended shortly thereafter.

Roster

Standings

Schedule and Results

|-
!colspan=12 style=";" | Regular Season

References

Columbia Lions men's ice hockey seasons
Columbia
Columbia
Columbia
Columbia